David Gurle is a French entrepreneur and engineer, credited as one of the pioneers of IP communications. He is founder and former CEO of Symphony Communication Services, LLC. In June 2022,  he launched Hive, a distributed, peer-to-peer storage platform.

Early life and education 
The son of a French diplomat, David spent his childhood between Turkey, Syria and Lebanon. His mother, a journalist for the BBC, also worked for the British secret service. His family settled in Cannes when he was 13. He studied engineering at ESIGETEL.

Career 
In 2014, David Gurle was appointed CEO of Symphony, following the acquisition of Perzo, a start-up he founded in Palo Alto, California in late 2012. Perzo was a mobile and web messaging platform that encrypted every message end-to-end using a three-layer encryption system. Perzo's security model was based on customer-controlled encryption keys for businesses who need to maintain control and confidentiality over their communications. The platform also maintained compliance with privacy laws and various regulatory rules.

Prior to Symphony, David was General Manager and Vice President of Skype's Business unit.

In 2003 as Global Head of Collaboration Services at Reuters, David and his team transitioned Reuters Messaging into a unified communications service. David connected Reuters Messaging with other communities with the intention of improving workflow productivity of financial information workers.

After joining Microsoft in 1999, David Gurle founded Microsoft's Real Time Communications business unit, running it for three years. He oversaw the development of the company’s collaboration products including NetMeeting, Windows Messenger, Exchange IM, Exchange Conferencing Server, Live Communications Server and Office Communications Server. While at Microsoft, David co-authored several Internet Engineering Task Force standards for presence and instant messaging for SIP.

Honors
In 2016, David was ranked #97 on “The New Establishment,” Vanity Fair’s “annual ranking of Silicon Valley hotshots, Hollywood moguls, Wall Street titans, and cultural icons.”

Publications
2007

L'essentiel de la VoIP - 2ème édition

2005

IP Telephony: Packet-based Multimedia Communications Systems

IP Telephony: Deploying Voice-over-IP Protocols by Olivier Hersent (2005-03-11)

Beyond VoIP Protocols: Understanding Voice Technology and Networking Techniques for IP Telephony

L'essentiel de la VoIP

2004

La voix sur IP Codecs, H.323, SIP, MGCP, déploiement et dimensionnement

References

Living people
20th-century French businesspeople
21st-century French businesspeople
French chief executives
Businesspeople from California
1966 births
People from Palo Alto, California
Skype people